This is a list of emperors of the Tang dynasty (618–690, 705–907) of China.

List of emperors 

The Chinese naming conventions is "Tang" (唐)+ temple name (e.g. Tang Gaozu), except for Emperors Shang and Ai, who are better known by their posthumous name.

Timeline

References

Notes

Sources
 
 
 
 

Tang
Lists of leaders of China
Lists of Chinese people